Acacia kettlewelliae, commonly known as buffalo wattle, is a tree or shrub of the genus Acacia and the subgenus Phyllodineae that is endemic to south eastern Australia.

Description
Like ost species of Acacia it has phyllodes rather than true leaves. The thin, evergreen phyllodes are situated on raised stem-projections and have an oblong to narrowly elliptic to narrowly oblanceolate shape. It blooms between September and December and produces racemose inflorescences that are prolific in the upper axils. The spherical flower-heads contain 8 to 11 loosely packed bright light golden flowers. The firmly chartaceous seed pods that form after flowering are glabrous and covered with a fine white powder.

Taxonomy
The species was first formally described by the botanist Joseph Maiden in 1916 as part of the work Notes on Acacia, (with description of new species) as published in the Journal and Proceedings of the Royal Society of New South Wales. It was reclassified as Racosperma kettlewelliae in 2003 by Leslie Pedley then transferred back to genus Acacia in 2006.
The specific epithet honours Agnes Louisa Kettlewell, who was an official with the Wattle Day League.

Distribution
It is native to south eastern parts of New South Wales in the Great Dividing Range and north eastern parts of Victoria. Its range is from around Tumut in the north to around Omeo in the south where it is often found on the lower slopes, on granite hillsides, along river flats and in gullies as a part of dry sclerophyll forest and woodland communities.

See also
 List of Acacia species

References

kettlewelliae
Flora of New South Wales
Flora of Victoria (Australia)
Plants described in 1916
Taxa named by Joseph Maiden